The Los Angeles Dodgers are the second most successful franchise in the National League and the third-most successful and second-most wealthy in Major League Baseball after the New York Yankees. The franchise was formerly based in Brooklyn and known originally as the "Grays" or "Trolley Dodgers" after the trams which supporters had to avoid to enter games. Later it became known successively as the "Bridegrooms", "Superbas", "Dodgers" and "Robins"; the present "Dodgers" was firmly established in 1932.

The franchise has won seven World Series, twenty-four pennants, and won the their division twenty times. Like the Yankees and Cardinals, the Dodgers have not lost 100 games in a season since World War I, with their worst record being in 1992 with 63 wins and 99 losses.  The following year, the Dodgers finished at .500 for the only time in 138 seasons. The most wins the Dodgers ever had in a season was 111, which they did in 2022, their most recent season.

The Dodgers have multiple periods of sustained excellence throughout their history. Their most successful period, between 1947 (Jackie Robinson’s first season) through 1966 (Sandy Koufax's final season), featured four championships, ten World Series appearances, and only two seasons with 71 or more losses. Their other period of sustained success was from 1973-1988, which was overseen by the end of Walter Alston’s managerial career (manager from 1954-1976) and of most of Tommy Lasorda’s (1976-1996). During this fifteen-year period, the team won two championships (tied for first during this stretch), five pennants, and won their division seven times. Currently, the Dodgers are in a stretch where they have won a World Series title, three National League pennants, while reaching the postseason ten straight seasons and winning nine National League West titles (eight in a row from 2013-2020). This stretch of success coincided when Guggenheim Partners brought the team shortly before the 2012 season for $2.15 billion.

In Brooklyn, they played predominantly at Washington Park (1898-1912) and historic Ebbets Field (1913-1957).

Season-by-season records

All-time records

Record by decade 
The following table describes the Dodgers' MLB win–loss record by decade.

These statistics are from Baseball-Reference.com's Los Angeles Dodgers History & Encyclopedia, and are current as of October 13, 2022.

Opening Day starting lineups
This is a chart of the Opening Day Starting Lineup for the Los Angeles Dodgers.

References

External links
Baseball-Reference.com Dodgers team index

Major League Baseball teams seasons
Seasons